GBW is the reporting mark for Green Bay and Western Railroad

It may also refer to:

 gbw, an ISO 639-3 designator for the Gabi-Gabi language
 Gain–bandwidth product
 Georgian Business Week, an English-language newspaper in Tbilisi, Georgia
 Ghribwal railway station, in Pakistan
 Glenbard West High School, in Chicago, Illinois
 Guild of Bookworkers, an American bookbinding organization